Krantiveer is a 1994 Indian Hindi-language action crime film directed and produced by Mehul Kumar. The film stars Nana Patekar, Dimple Kapadia, Atul Agnihotri, Mamta Kulkarni in the lead roles. Farida Jalal, Paresh Rawal, Tinu Anand, Danny Denzongpa are in supporting roles. It became the third highest-grossing film of the year, additionally winning three Star Screen Awards, four Filmfare Awards and one National Film Award.

The film was remade in Telugu as Punya Bhoomi Naa Desam (1995) and in Kannada as Parodi (2007). The sequel of Krantiveer was released as Krantiveer: The Revolution (2010). According to Box Office India, It was a blockbuster at the box office.

Plot
Pratap Tilak (Nana Patekar) is the grandson of Bheeshmanarayan Tilak, a freedom fighter. Pratap starts gambling and this leads to a spoiling attack of Bheeshmanarayan as he dies. Pratap's mother Durgadevi (Farida Jalal) enraged by all this, asks him to leave the village and go away. Pratap comes to Mumbai where he saves the life of chawl owner, Laxminath's (Paresh Rawal) son Atul (Atul Agnihotri). Laxminath decides to keep Pratap with him. When they grow up, Atul falls in love with Mamta (Mamta Kulkarni), who is the daughter of a builder named Yograj (Tinnu Anand). Pratap keeps laughing at press reporter Megha Dixit (Dimple Kapadia), who lives in the chawl and keeps on fighting injustice by writing about it in newspapers. Pratap teaches people to become strong and fight for themselves instead of waiting for other people to help them. Chattursingh Chita (Danny Denzongpa) and Yograj plan to build a resort and at the place, they arrange communal riots, mass killings, and burn the houses of people. Laxminath is murdered by Chattursingh Chita. Pratap learns that Megha's parents were murdered by Chattursingh Chita and she was raped by him. He proposes marriage to her. Mamta leaves her father's house and comes to Atul's house. Pratap kills the corrupted ministers, the judge, and the police officer. He is tried and sentenced to death. At the public hanging, he tells the onlookers that they are all cowards and he is willing to die, when a lawyer comes to the scene informing that Pratap has been pardoned by the President. Chattursingh Chita emerges on scene to kill Pratap who picks a 
rifle and kills Chita by the bayonet. This story is about a brave person who decides to face injustice and is ready to lay his life down for this cause.

Cast

Nana Patekar as Pratap Narayan Tilak
Dimple Kapadia as Megha Dixit
Atul Agnihotri as Atul
Mamta Kulkarni as Mamta
Farida Jalal as Pratap's Mother
Paresh Rawal as Laxmidas Dayal
Tinu Anand as Yograj
Danny Denzongpa as Chatur Singh Chita
Mushtaq Khan as Babbanrao Deshmukh
Ishrat Ali as Chandrasen Azaad
Vikas Anand as Judge Hukam Ali Javed
Mahesh Anand as Vaishiram
Ghanashyam Nayak as Kalyanji Bhai
Janardhan Parab as Ismail
Shafi Inamdar as Interviewer
Mehul Kumar as Advocate
Sujit Kumar as Police Commissioner
K. K. Raj as Sub-Inspector Satyawadi Dubey
Mulraj Rajda as Judge Vishwanath Singh
Mukesh Rawal as Jailor
Viju Khote as Dr. Vishwanath 
Bindu as Spl Appearance in Song Love Rap

Crew
 Producer: Mehul Kumar
 Director: Mehul Kumar
 Actor : Nana Patekar, Atul Agnihotri, Dimple Kapadia, Mamta Kulkarni
 Story: Mehul Kumar
 Dialogues: K.K. Singh
 Lyrics: Sameer
 Music: Anand–Milind
 Choreography: Chinni Prakash, Madhav Kishen
 Editing: Yusuf Sheikh
 Costume Design: Shammim

Critical reception
The Indian Express wrote that "Nana Patekar, who can lay claim to being the best actor in Bollywood, is the chief reason to see Krantiveer". The review further noted the "strong supporting cast", including Kapadia and Rawal. Trade journal Film Information wrote that the lead "character, etched out by the writer, and its excellent portrayal by the hero that make the film a differently enjoyable fare."

Awards
National Film Awards:
Best Actor – Nana Patekar

 40th Filmfare Awards:

Won

 Best Actor – Nana Patekar
 Best Supporting Actress – Dimple Kapadia
 Best Story – K. K. Singh
 Best Dialogue – K. K. Singh

Nominated

 Best Film – Mehul Kumar
 Best Director – Mehul Kumar
 Best Villain – Danny Denzongpa

Star Screen Awards:
Best Actor – Nana Patekar
Best Dialogue – K. K. Singh
Best Story – K. K. Singh

Music 

The soundtrack of the film contains 6 songs. The music is composed by Anand–Milind, with lyrics authored by Sameer.

References

External links

1994 films
1990s Hindi-language films
Hindi films remade in other languages
Films featuring a Best Actor National Award-winning performance
Films scored by Anand–Milind
Films directed by Mehul Kumar
1990s action drama films
Indian action drama films
1990s crime action films
Law enforcement in fiction
Indian crime action films